Coelostathma is a genus of moths belonging to the subfamily Tortricinae of the family Tortricidae.

Species
Coelostathma binotata Walsingham, 1913
Coelostathma contigua Meyrick, 1926
Coelostathma discopunctana Clemens, 1860
Coelostathma immutabilis Meyrick, 1926
Coelostathma insularis Brown & Miller, 1999
Coelostathma parallelana Walsingham, 1897
Coelostathma placidana Powell & Brown, 2012

Placement uncertain
Coelostathma caerulea Landry, in Landry & Powell, 2001
Coelostathma cocoana Landry, in Landry & Powell, 2001
Coelostathma continua Landry, in Landry & Powell, 2001
Coelostathma pygmaea Landry, in Landry & Powell, 2001
Coelostathma xocoatlana Landry, in Landry & Powell, 2001

See also
List of Tortricidae genera

References

 , 1860, Proc. Acad. Nat. Sci.Philad. 12: 355.
 , 2005, World Catalogue of Insects, 5

External links
tortricidae.com
tortricidae.com

Sparganothini
Tortricidae genera